

Total statistics

Statistics by country

Statistics by competition

UEFA Champions League / European Cup

UEFA Cup Winners' Cup / European Cup Winners' Cup

UEFA Europa League / UEFA Cup

External links
  Official website

FC Politehnica Timișoara
Romanian football clubs in international competitions